The 2016 Super Rugby season was the 21st season of Super Rugby and the first season featuring an expanded 18-team format. It was also the first season that teams outside Australia, New Zealand and South Africa featured, with the Jaguares from Argentina and the Sunwolves from Japan taking part. This season also saw the return of the Kings, who competed just once before, in the 2013 Super Rugby season.
The round-robin games took place every weekend from 26 February to 16 July 2016 (with a break for international matches during June), followed by the finals series at the end of July and culminating in the final on 6 August.

The Hurricanes won their first championship after repeating their efforts of 2015 by finishing first in the regular season and hosting the final at Westpac Stadium, but this time they won, beating the Lions 20–3. Unlike 2015, where the Hurricanes looked likely to finish the regular season first with a number of rounds to go, they were sitting in seventh going into the final week of the regular season and while guaranteed a play-off spot, they required a number of upset results to elevate them to first. In particular the Lions losing to the Jaguares and scoring no match points after sending an under-strength side to Argentina, thereby losing their chance to host the final.

Competition format

The 18 teams were grouped geographically in two regional groups, each consisting of two conferences: the Australasian Group, with five teams in the Australian Conference and five teams in the New Zealand Conference and the South African Group, with six South African teams, one Argentinean team and one Japanese team split into a four-team Africa 1 Conference and a four-team Africa 2 Conference.

In the group stages, there were 17 rounds of matches, where each team played 15 matches and had two rounds of byes for a total of 135 matches.

Teams played six intra-conference matches; in the four-team African Conferences, each team played the other three teams in their conference at home and away, while in the five-team Australasian Conferences, each team played two teams home and away and once against the other two teams (one at home and one away). The other nine matches were a single round of matches against each team in the other conference in their group, as well as against each team from one of the conferences in the other group. For 2016, the teams in Africa 1 played the teams in the Australian Conference, while the teams in Africa 2 played the teams in the New Zealand Conference.

The top team in each of the four conferences automatically qualified to the Quarter Finals. The next top three teams in the Australasian Group and the next top team in the South African group also qualified to the Quarter Finals as wildcards. The conference winners were seeded #1 to #4 for the Quarter Finals, in order of log points gained during the group stages, while the wildcards were seeded as #5 to #8 in order of log points gained during the group stages.

In the Quarter Finals, the conference winners hosted the first round of the finals, with the highest-seeded conference winner hosting the fourth-seeded wildcard entry, the second-seeded conference winner hosting the third-seeded wildcard entry, the third-seeded conference winner hosting the second-seeded wildcard entry and the fourth-seeded conference winner hosting the top-seed wildcard entry.

The Quarter Final winners progressed to the Semi-Finals, where the highest seed to reach the Semi-Finals hosted the lowest seed and the second-seeded semi-finalist hosted the third-seeded team.

The winners of the Semi-Finals progressed to the Final, at the venue of the highest-seeded team.

Standings

Matches

The fixtures for the 2016 Super Rugby competition were released on 28 September 2015: The following matches were played during the regular season:

Finals

The four conference winners advanced to the Quarter Finals, where they had home advantage against four wildcard teams, which consisted of the third to fifth-ranked teams in the Australasian Group and the third-ranked team in the South African Group.

The final seedings of these teams were:

The play-off fixtures were as follows:

Quarter-finals

Semi-finals

Final

Players

Squads

The following squads were named for the 2016 Super Rugby season:

Player statistics

The top ten points scorers during the 2016 Super Rugby season are:

Referees

The following refereeing panel was appointed by SANZAAR for the 2016 Super Rugby season:

Attendances

References

External links
 Super Rugby websites:
SANZAAR Super Rugby
Australia Super Rugby
New Zealand Super Rugby

 SuperXV.com

 
2016
2016 in Argentine rugby union
2016 in Australian rugby union
2015–16 in Japanese rugby union
2016–17 in Japanese rugby union
2016 in New Zealand rugby union
2016 in South African rugby union
2016 rugby union tournaments for clubs